Alaçam Population Exchange Museum is a museum in Alaçam, Turkey. Alaçam is an ilçe (district) of Samsun Province.

Background

According to the Convention Concerning the Exchange of Greek and Turkish Populations signed in Lausanne on 30 January 1923, after the Turkish War of Independence, the Moslem population of Greece (except West Thrace) and the Greek Orthodox population of  Turkey (except  İstanbul and certain islands) were to be exchanged. This exchange was compulsory, with those involved having no right to ever return to their former homeland. In Turkey, Muslims arriving from Greece were known as mübadils: Mübadele means "exchange" and mübadil means "those who were exchanged".

The building and the exhibition
The two storey building in a neighborhood named Kızlargarajı is a 19th-century building which was used as a primary school during the Ottoman Empire era. In 2010 it was restored by the local authority of Samsun. In the ground floor, in addition to administrative services, there is a thematic gallery of exchange photos. The exhibition galleries are in the upper floor. These are ethnographic items such as clothes, kitchen tools and chests of the mübadils. Also the copies of the passaports used during the exchange are exhibited.

References

Museums in Samsun
History museums in Turkey
2010 establishments in Turkey
Museums established in 2010